Deeds of the Disturber is the fifth in a series of historical mystery novels, written by Elizabeth Peters and featuring fictional sleuth and archaeologist Amelia Peabody. This is the only book in the series which takes place entirely in England.

Explanation of the novel's title
The title of the book comes from the ancient Egyptian Hymn to Osiris from the Eighteenth Dynasty: "His sister was his protector / She who drives off the foe / Who foils the deeds of the disturber / By the power of her utterance."

Plot summary

Immediately after their adventure in Lion in the Valley, the Emersons return home to England for the summer of 1896, as is their custom. Upon their arrival, Amelia finds that her despised brother James wants to dump his two children, Percy and Violet, on the Emersons for the summer. Amelia accepts, if only to instill some higher principles in the obviously spoiled children.

Kevin O'Connell enters the story as he reports on a supposed curse on a mummy in the British Museum. He's competing against a fellow journalist, M. Minton, who always seems to "scoop" him, and he pesters the Emersons for their knowledge and expertise on Egyptology and detection. Imagine Amelia's surprise when M. Minton turns out to be a young woman!

Meanwhile, Ramses and Percy hate each other on sight, Violet turns out to be an empty-headed doll who overeats and throws temper tantrums, and Ramses' belongings keep mysteriously ending up in Percy's possession.

The mummy "mystery" begins to take on more sinister portent as a masked figure stalks the Museum, a woman from Emerson's past turns up as the owner of an opium den, and the Emersons (including Ramses) are subjected to the usual attempts at injury and kidnapping. Eventually, Amelia, Emerson, and Inspector Cuff of Scotland Yard find themselves trapped in a cellar which is about to be flooded, with no backup and only Amelia's corset to save them...

See also

 List of characters in the Amelia Peabody series

Amelia Peabody
1988 American novels
Fiction set in 1896
Novels set in the 1890s
Historical mystery novels